D111 is the main state road on the island of Šolta in Croatia connecting ferry port of Rogač (via the D112), from where Jadrolinija ferries go to the mainland, docking in Split and the D410 state road to Maslinica, Stomorska and to Nečujam (via Ž6158).

The road, as well as all other state roads in Croatia, is managed and maintained by Hrvatske ceste, a state-owned company.

Road junctions and populated areas

Sources

See also
 Hrvatske ceste
 Jadrolinija

State roads in Croatia
Transport in Split-Dalmatia County
Šolta